Israel annexation may refer to:

Annexation of East Jerusalem, as provided by the Jerusalem Law in 1980
Annexation of the Golan Heights, as provided by the Golan Heights Law in 1981
Proposed Israeli annexation of the West Bank
Annexation of the Jordan Valley, a proposed annexation plan

See also
Israeli-occupied territories, which includes occupied territories that have not been annexed